Marco Antonio Tomati (1591 – 24 January 1665) was a Roman Catholic prelate who served as Bishop of Bitetto (1641–1655).

Biography
Marco Antonio Tomati was born in Caravino, Italy in 1591.
On 16 December 1641, he was appointed during the papacy of Pope Urban VIII as Bishop of Bitetto.
On 22 December 1641, he was consecrated bishop by Ciriaco Rocci, Cardinal-Priest of San Salvatore in Lauro, with Alfonso Gonzaga, Titular Archbishop of Rhodus, and Alfonso Sacrati, Bishop Emeritus of Comacchio, serving as co-consecrators. 
He served as Bishop of Bitetto until his resignation in 1655.
He died on 24 January 1665.
 
While bishop, he was the principal co-consecrator of Girolamo Melzi, Bishop of Pavia (1659).

References 

17th-century Italian Roman Catholic bishops
Bishops appointed by Pope Urban VIII
1591 births
1665 deaths